Mahbubur Rahman may refer to:

 Mahbubur Rahman (politician) (1940–2021), Bangladeshi lawyer, politician and a former education minister
 Md. Mahbubur Rahman (born 1954), Bangladeshi politician from Patuakhali and a former state minister of water resources
 Mahbubur Rahman (cricketer) (born 1969), Bangladeshi cricketer 
 Mahbubur Rahman (umpire) (born 1957), Bangladeshi cricket umpire
 Mahbubur Rahman Sufil (born 1999), Bangladeshi footballer
 Muhammad Mahbubur Rahman, Bangladeshi lieutenant general and a former Chief of Army Staff
 Mahbubur Rahman, (born 2000), ICT Security

See also
 Mahbubur
 Rahman (name)